The 2001–02 National Division Three South was the second season (fifteenth overall) of the fourth division (south) of the English domestic rugby union competition using the name National Division Three South.  New teams to the division included Lydney and Camberley who were relegated from the 2000–01 National Division Two while promoted teams included Old Colfeians and Old Patesians, champions of London Division 1 and South West Division 1 respectively.  The league system was 2 points for a win and 1 point for a draw with the league champions going straight up into National Division Two and the runners up playing a playoff against the runners up from National Division Three North for the final promotion place.

Two Cornish teams dominated the division this season, with Penzance & Newlyn finishing 1 point ahead of Launceston to win the league title.  Launceston, as runners up, found themselves in a similar position to that of the previous year, where they needed to win a playoff against the runners up of the 2001–02 National Division Three North.  This time the Polson Bridge side were successful, beating Dudley Kingswinford 26 – 0 to clinch promotion and join Penzance & Newlyn in the 2002–03 National Division Two.  At the opposite end of the table Cinderford and Clifton would be the two teams to be relegated with both sides dropping to South West Division 1.

Participating teams and locations

Final league table

Results

Round 1

Round 2

Round 3

Round 4

Round 5

Round 6

Round 7

Round 8

Round 9

Round 10

Round 11

Round 12

Round 13

Round 14

Round 15 

Postponed.  Game rescheduled to 16 February 2002.

Postponed.  Game rescheduled to 16 February 2002.

Postponed.  Game rescheduled to 16 February 2002.

Postponed.  Game rescheduled to 16 February 2002.

Postponed.  Game rescheduled to 16 February 2002.

Postponed.  Game rescheduled to 16 February 2002.

Round 16

Round 17

Round 18 

Postponed.  Game rescheduled to 2 March 2002.

Postponed.  Game rescheduled to 2 March 2002.

Round 19 

Postponed.  Game rescheduled to 23 March 2002.

Postponed.  Game rescheduled to 23 March 2002.

Postponed.  Game rescheduled to 2 March 2002.

Round 20

Round 15 (rescheduled games) 

Game rescheduled from 5 January 2002.

Game rescheduled from 5 January 2002.

Game rescheduled from 5 January 2002.

Game rescheduled from 5 January 2002.

Game rescheduled from 5 January 2002.

Game rescheduled from 5 January 2002.

Round 21

Rounds 18 & 19 (rescheduled games) 

Game rescheduled from 26 January 2002.

Game rescheduled from 2 February 2002.

Game rescheduled from 26 January 2002.

Round 22

Round 23

Round 19 (rescheduled games) 

Game rescheduled from 2 February 2002.

Game rescheduled from 2 February 2002.

Round 24

Round 25

Round 26

Promotion play-off
The league runners up of National Division Three South and North would meet in a playoff game for promotion to National Division Two.  Launceston were runners-up in the south and because they had a better league record than north runners-up, Dudley Kingswinford, they hosted the play-off match.

Total season attendances 
Not including promotion playoff.

Individual statistics 

 Note that points scorers includes tries as well as conversions, penalties and drop goals.

Top points scorers

Top try scorers

Season records

Team
Largest home win — 80 pts 
85 - 5 North Walsham at home to Cinderford on 6 October 2001
Largest away win — 37 pts
56 - 19 Penzance & Newyln away to Old Colfeians on 19 January 2002
Most points scored — 85 pts 
85 - 5 North Walsham at home to Cinderford on 6 October 2001
Most tries in a match — 14
North Walsham at home to Cinderford on 6 October 2001
Most conversions in a match — 9 (x3)
Penzance & Newlyn at home to Old Patesians on 20 October 2001
Penzance & Newlyn at home to Clifton on 16 March 2002
Penzance & Newlyn away to Redruth on 30 March 2002
Most penalties in a match — 6 (x5)
Launceston at home to North Walsham on 1 September 2001
Camberley at home to Tabard on 3 November 2001
Barking at home to Redruth on 10 November 2001
North Walsham away to Blackheath on 10 November 2001
Barking at home to Westcombe Park on 12 January 2002
Most drop goals in a match — 2 
Lydney at home to Redruth on 22 September 2001

Player
Most points in a match — 34
 Nat Saumi Penzance & Newlyn at home to Barking on 22 September 2001
Most tries in a match — 4 (x4)
 Andy Thorpe for North Walsham at home to Cinderford on 6 October 2001
 Richard Newton for Penzance & Newlyn at home to Old Colfeians on 10 November 2001
 Victor Olonga for Penzance & Newlyn at home to Tabard on 23 February 2002
 Mark Fatialofa for Launceston at home to Old Patesians on 23 March 2002
Most conversions in a match — 9 (x3)
 Nat Saumi for Penzance & Newlyn at home to Old Patesians on 20 October 2001
 Nat Saumi for Penzance & Newlyn at home to Clifton on 16 March 2002
 Nat Saumi for Penzance & Newlyn away to Redruth on 30 March 2002
Most penalties in a match — 6 (x5)
 Danny Sloman for Launceston at home to North Walsham on 1 September 2001
 Stephen Webb for Camberley at home to Tabard on 3 November 2001
 David Gilmore for Barking at home to Redruth on 10 November 2001
 John Dwight for North Walsham away to Blackheath on 10 November 2001
 Justin Azzopardi for Barking at home to Westcombe Park on 12 January 2002
Most drop goals in a match — 2
 Neil Merrett for Lydney at home to Redruth on 22 September 2001

Attendances
Highest — 3,000 
Penzance & Newlyn at home to Launceston on 26 January 2002
Lowest — 100 (x6)
Westcombe Park at home to Redruth on 6 October 2001
Old Patesians at home to Camberley on 10 November 2001
Old Colfeians at home to Lydney on 24 November 2001
Clifton at home to Camberley on 9 February 2002
Camberley at home to Launceston on 16 February 2002
Clifton at home to Redruth on 2 March 2002
Highest Average Attendance — 1,127
Penzance & Newlyn
Lowest Average Attendance — 157
Clifton

See also
 English rugby union system
 Rugby union in England

References

External links
 NCA Rugby

2001–02
2001–02 in English rugby union leagues